Yunxiao Niangniang , also known as Zhao Yunxiao, is a Chinese goddess of childbirth. She is the oldest of the Sanxiao Shengmu (Holy mothers of three skies, 三霄聖母) or Sanxiao Niangniang (Ladies of three stars, 三霄娘娘). Sanxiao Niangniang is also worshipped as the household deity or toilet god. It is said "the kitchen god was in the kitchen and Sanxiao was in the cottage".

Legend
According to the Investiture of the Gods, Zhao Yunxiao is a female celestial aiding Grand Old Master Wen Zhong. She is one of the three younger sisters of the God of wealth Zhao Gongming. The three sisters were killed when fighting Jiang Ziya. Later, they were appointed as deities. They are worshipped as deities controlling smallpox and children's diseases.

Later on, she and her younger sisters Zhao Qiongxiao and Zhao Bixiao were combined into three in one, known as Zhusheng Niangniang.

References

Childhood goddesses
Chinese goddesses
Investiture of the Gods characters
Smallpox deities
Toilet goddesses